Freer Cottage is a historic cure cottage located at Saranac Lake, Franklin County, New York.  It was built about 1920 and modified in 1926–1928. It is a -story, wood-frame dwelling with a gambrel roof and 2-story addition in the Colonial Revival style.  It features two cure porches. Also on the property is a contributing former garage.

It was listed on the National Register of Historic Places in 1992.

References

Houses on the National Register of Historic Places in New York (state)
Colonial Revival architecture in New York (state)
Houses completed in 1920
Houses in Franklin County, New York
National Register of Historic Places in Franklin County, New York